Hadodo (Syriac: ܚܕܕܐ) is an Assyrian family name.

Hadodo means Blacksmith in the Aramaic-Turoyo dialect. The Hadodo name derives from the ancient name Haddad (Aramaic: ܚܕܕ or ܚܕܐܕ) which dates back to the ancient era of Mesopotamia.  

People with the surname Hadodo are usually Assyrians from Tur Abdin, which are living in the Assyrian diaspora now.

Persons with the surname Hadodo

Naim Mikhail Hadodo, Assyrian politician, president of Mesopotamia National Council, successor of GHB
Ignatius Habib Hadodo (born 1623), Syriac Orthodox Patriarch of Tur Abdin (1674–1707)

Surnames
Aramaic words and phrases